Oberea ruficollis is a species of beetle in the family Cerambycidae. It was described by Johan Christian Fabricius in 1792, originally under the genus Saperda. It is known from the United States.

References

ruficollis
Beetles described in 1792